Praticolella griseola is a species of land snail, a terrestrial gastropod mollusk in the family Polygyridae.

Distribution 
The distribution of Praticolella griseola includes Cuba and Costa Rica 

The non-indigenous distribution of Praticolella griseola includes Martinique.

Ecology 
Praticolella griseola is a tree dwelling species.

Predators of Praticolella griseola include larvae of the firefly bug Alecton discoidalis.

References

Polygyridae
Gastropods described in 1841